Wilfred Bennetto Currie  was an Anglican priest in the 20th century.

Educated at the University of Edinburgh and ordained in 1933, Currie was a curate at St John's Aberdeen and then Priest in charge of St Mark's in  the same city. He was a Chaplain to the British armed forces during World War II after which he held incumbencies at Longside  and Stirling before he became Provost of St Ninian's Cathedral, Perth in 1955, a post he held until 1969.

References

Alumni of the University of Edinburgh
Provosts of St Ninian's Cathedral, Perth